Alexander Rutherford Russell (1825 – 20 May 1886) was  Dean of Adelaide from 1866 until his death in 1886.

He was born in Perthshire, educated at Trinity College Dublin, and ordained in 1851.

He was promoted from St Andrew's Church, Walkerville in March 1855 to rector of St John's Church, Adelaide in November 1859. He founded St Paul's Church, Adelaide on Pulteney Street in 1860, and succeeded James Farrell as Dean of Adelaide.

Recognition
Bishop Nutter Thomas, in delivering a eulogy "Well done, good and faithful servant"  for Canon Sunter of St Paul's Church, made reference to his predecessor Russell as "poet and preacher".

Bibliography
Fred T. Whitington Some words in memory of Alexander Russell, Dean of Adelaide pub. W.K. Thomas, Adelaide, 1886

References

Alumni of Trinity College Dublin
Australian Anglican priests
Deans of Adelaide
1886 deaths
1803 births